In anthropology, folkloristics, and the social and behavioral sciences, emic and etic refer to two kinds of field research done and viewpoints obtained.

The "emic" approach is an insider's perspective, which looks at the beliefs, values, and practices of a particular culture from the perspective of the people who live within that culture. This approach aims to understand the cultural meaning and significance of a particular behavior or practice, as it is understood by the people who engage in it.

The "etic" approach, on the other hand, is an outsider's perspective, which looks at a culture from the perspective of an outside observer or researcher. This approach tends to focus on the observable behaviors and practices of a culture, and aims to understand them in terms of their functional or evolutionary significance. The etic approach often involves the use of standardized measures and frameworks to compare different cultures, and may involve the use of concepts and theories from other disciplines, such as psychology or sociology.

Both the emic and etic approaches have their own strengths and limitations, and both can be useful in understanding different aspects of culture and behavior. Some anthropologists argue that a combination of both approaches is necessary for a complete understanding of a culture, while others argue that one approach may be more appropriate depending on the specific research question being addressed.

Definitions
"The emic approach investigates how local people think...". How they perceive and categorize the world, their rules for behavior, what has meaning for them, and how they imagine and explain things. "The etic (scientist-oriented) approach shifts the focus from local observations, categories, explanations, and interpretations to those of the anthropologist.  The etic approach realizes that members of a culture often are too involved in what they are doing... to interpret their cultures impartially. When using the etic approach, the ethnographer emphasizes what he or she considers important."

Although emics and etics are sometimes regarded as inherently in conflict and one can be preferred to the exclusion of the other, the complementarity of emic and etic approaches to anthropological research has been widely recognized, especially in the areas of interest concerning the characteristics of human nature as well as the form and function of human social systems.

Emic and etic approaches of understanding behavior and personality fall under the study of cultural anthropology. Cultural anthropology states that people are shaped by their cultures and their subcultures, and we must account for this in the study of personality.  One way is looking at things through an emic approach. This approach "is culture specific because it focuses on a single culture and it is understood on its own terms."  As explained below, the term "emic" originated from the specific linguistic term "phonemic", from phoneme, which is a language-specific way of abstracting speech sounds.

 An 'emic' account is a description of behavior or a belief in terms meaningful (consciously or unconsciously) to the actor; that is, an emic account comes from a person within the culture.  Almost anything from within a culture can provide an emic account.
 An 'etic' account is a description of a behavior or belief by a social analyst or scientific observer (a student or scholar of anthropology or sociology, for example), in terms that can be applied across cultures; that is, an etic account attempts to be 'culturally neutral', limiting any ethnocentric, political or cultural bias or alienation by the observer.

When these two approaches are combined, the "richest" view of a culture or society can be understood. On its own, an emic approach would struggle with applying overarching values to a single culture. The etic approach is helpful in enabling researchers to see more than one aspect of one culture, and in applying observations to cultures around the world.

History
The terms were coined in 1954 by linguist Kenneth Pike, who argued that the tools developed for describing linguistic behaviors could be adapted to the description of any human social behavior. As Pike noted, social scientists have long debated whether their knowledge is objective or subjective. Pike's innovation was to turn away from an epistemological debate, and turn instead to a methodological solution. Emic and etic are derived from the linguistic terms phonemic and  phonetic, respectively, where a phone is a distinct speech sound or gesture, regardless of whether the exact sound is critical to the meanings of words, whereas a phoneme is a speech sound in a given language that, if swapped with another phoneme, could change one word to another. The possibility of a truly objective description was discounted by Pike himself in his original work; he proposed the emic-etic dichotomy in anthropology as a way around philosophic issues about the very nature of objectivity.

The terms were also championed by anthropologists Ward Goodenough and Marvin Harris with slightly different connotations from those used by Pike. Goodenough was primarily interested in understanding the culturally specific meaning of specific beliefs and practices; Harris was primarily interested in explaining human behavior.

Pike, Harris, and others have argued that cultural "insiders" and "outsiders" are equally capable of producing emic and etic accounts of their culture. Some researchers use "etic" to refer to objective or outsider accounts, and "emic" to refer to subjective or insider accounts.

Margaret Mead was an anthropologist who studied the patterns of adolescence in Samoa. She discovered that the difficulties and the transitions that adolescents faced are culturally influenced. The hormones that are released during puberty can be defined using an etic framework, because adolescents globally have the same hormones being secreted. However, Mead concluded that how adolescents respond to these hormones is greatly influenced by their cultural norms. Through her studies, Mead found that simple classifications about behaviors and personality could not be used because peoples’ cultures influenced their behaviors in such a radical way. Her studies helped create an emic approach of understanding behaviors and personality. Her research deduced that culture has a significant impact in shaping an individual's personality.

Carl Jung, a Swiss psychoanalyst, is a researcher who took an emic approach in his studies. Jung studied mythology, religion, ancient rituals, and dreams, leading him to believe that there are archetypes that can be identified and used to categorize people's behaviors. Archetypes are universal structures of the collective unconscious that refer to the inherent way people are predisposed to perceive and process information. The main archetypes that Jung studied were the persona (how people choose to present themselves to the world), the anima and animus (part of people experiencing the world in viewing the opposite sex, that guides how they select their romantic partner), and the shadow (dark side of personalities because people have a concept of evil; well-adjusted people must integrate both good and bad parts of themselves). Jung looked at the role of the mother and deduced that all people have mothers and see their mothers in a similar way; they offer nurture and comfort. His studies also suggest that "infants have evolved to suck milk from the breast, it is also the case that all children have inborn tendencies to react in certain ways." This way of looking at the mother is an emic way of applying a concept cross-culturally and universally.

Importance as regards personality
Emic and etic approaches are important to understanding personality because problems can arise "when concepts, measures, and methods are carelessly transferred to other cultures in attempts to make cross-cultural generalizations about personality." It is hard to apply certain generalizations of behavior to people who are so diverse and culturally different. One example of this is the F-scale (Macleod). The F-scale, which was created by Theodor Adorno, is used to measure authoritarian personality, which can, in turn, be used to predict prejudiced behaviors. This test, when applied to Americans accurately depicts prejudices towards black individuals. However, when a study was conducted in South Africa using the F-Scale, (Pettigrew and Friedman) results did not predict any prejudices towards black individuals. This study used emic approaches of study by conducting interviews with the locals and etic approaches by giving participants generalized personality tests.

See also
 Exonym and endonym

Other explorations of the differences between reality and humans' models of it:
 Blind men and an elephant
 Emic and etic units
 Internalism and externalism
 Map–territory relation

References

Further reading

External links
  Emic and Etic Standpoints for the Description of Behavior, chapter 2 in Language in Relation to a Unified Theory of the Structure of Human Behavior, vol 2, by Kenneth Pike (published in 1954 by Summer Institute of Linguistics)

Anthropology
Dichotomies
Ethnography
Folklore
Metatheory